Oleksandr Horbachuk (born 11 October 1972) is a Ukrainian fencer. He competed in the individual épée event at the 2000 Summer Olympics.

References

External links
 

1972 births
Living people
Ukrainian male épée fencers
Olympic fencers of Ukraine
Fencers at the 2000 Summer Olympics